Haikouichthys  is an extinct genus of craniate (animals with notochords and distinct heads) that lived 518 million years ago, during the Cambrian explosion of multicellular life.  Haikouichthys had a defined skull and other characteristics that have led paleontologists to label it a true craniate, and even to be popularly characterized as one of the earliest fishes. Cladistic analysis indicates that the animal is probably a basal chordate or a basal craniate; but it does not possess sufficient features to be included uncontroversially even in either stem group. It was formally described in 1999.

Description

The holotype of Haikouichthys ercaicunensis was found in the Yuansshan member of the Qiongzhusi Formation in the 'Eoredlichia' Zone near Haikou at Ercaicun, Kunming City, Yunnan, China, hence its name "Haikou fish from Ercaicun". The fossil was recovered among the Chengjiang fauna, in one of a series of Lagerstätten sites where thousands of exquisitely preserved soft-bodied fossils have already been found. Following the discovery of the holotype, additional Lower Cambrian fossils of Haikouichthys ercaicunensis have been discovered. 

The animal has a distinct head and tail. The head has at least six and perhaps nine probable gills. There are a number of segments (myomeres) with rear directed chevrons in the tail. There is a notochord. There is a prominent dorsal fin with fin radials similar, but not comparable, to those of hagfish and lampreys. The fin radials seem to angle "forward" toward the end thought on the basis of internal structures to be the head. This happens with a few modern fish but is an uncommon arrangement. There are 13 circular structures along the bottom that may be gonads, slime organs, or something else entirely.

See also

 Ostracoderm
 Arandaspis
 Pikaia – Cambrian chordate
 Myllokunmingia – close relative
 Zhongjianichthys – eel-like close relative
 Lancelet – living animal with similar morphology

References

External links
 Oldest fish fossil caught

Maotianshan shales fossils
Prehistoric jawless fish genera
Fossil taxa described in 1999
Cambrian fish
Cambrian genus first appearances
Cambrian genus extinctions
Cambrian chordates